"Maher-shalal-hash-baz" (– "Hurry to the spoils!" or "He has made haste to the plunder!") was the second prophetic name mentioned in Isaiah chapter 8–9.

Biblical accounts
The name is mentioned twice in the Hebrew Bible, both times in the Book of Isaiah chapter 8:

Isaiah 8:1
Moreover the LORD said unto me, Take thee a great roll and write in it with a man's pen concerning Mahershalalhashbaz.

Isaiah 8:3
And I went unto the prophetess; and she conceived and bare a son. Then said the LORD to me, Call his name Mahershalalhashbaz.

Analysis
The child Maher-shalal-hash-baz is the second prophetic-name child after the birth of Immanuel – traditionally understood as the son of Abi the bride of king Ahaz, i.e., the future king Hezekiah, by many Jewish commentators, or of another woman. The phrases maher-shalal and hash-baz are synonymous, both meaning approximately "quickly to the plunder". The name Maher-shalal-hash-baz is a reference to the impending plunder of Samaria and Damascus by the king of Assyria, Tiglath-Pileser III (734–732 BCE).

This is often counted the longest name (and word) used in the Bible, though a possible longer name-phrase in Isaiah is found in  "called Pele-joez-el-gibbor-abi-ad-sar-shalom"

The section is also quoted in the Book of Mormon.

See also
 Isaiah

References

External links
 Complete Bible Genealogy
 The Thompson Chain-Reference Bible, New International Version, 1990, pg. 765.

Book of Isaiah people
Hezekiah